The Brisbane Australia Temple is the 115th operating temple of the Church of Jesus Christ of Latter-day Saints (LDS Church). It is at 200 River Terrace, Kangaroo Point in Brisbane, Queensland, Australia.

History
On 20 July 1998, the LDS Church announced that a temple would be built in Brisbane. The church's temple in Brisbane is its fifth in Australia. The church has grown rapidly in the country. In 1955 there were 3,000 members in Australia; now there are 186 meetinghouses throughout Australia and more than 106,000 members. The temple in Brisbane serves 20,000 LDS Church members in the area. Of the five temples in Australia, four were opened within a three-year period.

On 26 May 2001, Kenneth Johnson presided at the groundbreaking ceremony and site dedication. Construction of the temple began in November 2001 and took 18 months.

A public open house was held from 10 May through 7 June 2003. The Brisbane Australia Temple was then dedicated on 15 June 2003 by LDS Church president Gordon B. Hinckley. The 10,700 sq. ft. temple features two ordinance rooms and two sealing rooms.

In 2020, like all the church's other temples, the Brisbane Australia Temple was closed in response to the coronavirus pandemic.

See also

 Comparison of temples of The Church of Jesus Christ of Latter-day Saints
 List of temples of The Church of Jesus Christ of Latter-day Saints
 List of temples of The Church of Jesus Christ of Latter-day Saints by geographic region
 Temple architecture (Latter-day Saints)
 The Church of Jesus Christ of Latter-day Saints in Australia

References

External links

 Official Brisbane Australia Temple page
 Brisbane Australia Temple at ChurchofJesusChristTemples.org

2003 establishments in Australia
Temples (LDS Church) completed in 2003
Religious buildings and structures in Brisbane
Temples (LDS Church) in Australia
Christianity in Queensland
Temples in Queensland
Kangaroo Point, Queensland